Richard H. Lyon (August 24, 1929 – January 21, 2019) was an American acoustical engineer.

Early life
Lyon was born in Evansville, Indiana, on August 24, 1929, to parents Chester and Gertrude Lyon. 

He attended Evansville College in his hometown, graduating in 1952 with a bachelor's degree in physics. Lyon pursued further study in the subject at the Massachusetts Institute of Technology. Upon earning his doctorate in 1955, Lyon joined the faculty of the University of Minnesota, where he was assistant professor of electrical engineering.

Career
After three years of teaching, Lyon went to the University of Manchester for post doctoral study funded by the National Science Foundation. Lyon then worked at Bolt, Beranek, and Newman for ten years. He joined MIT faculty as a lecturer in 1963, and was made professor of mechanical engineering in 1970. While teaching, Lyon founded Cambridge Collaborative, Inc. and RH Lyon Corp. Lyon was elected to membership of the National Academy of Engineering "for development of statistical energy analysis and machinery diagnostic techniques" in 1995, the same year he ended his career in academia and won the Rayleigh Medal. 

He was elected to fellowship of the Acoustical Society of America and has received the ASA Silver (1998) and Gold Medals (2003), as well as the Gold Medal from the Acoustical Society of India.

Death
Lyon died on January 21, 2019, aged 89.

References

1929 births
2019 deaths
American acoustical engineers
People from Evansville, Indiana
University of Evansville alumni
MIT Department of Physics alumni
MIT School of Engineering faculty
University of Minnesota faculty
Members of the United States National Academy of Engineering
American company founders
20th-century American businesspeople
21st-century American businesspeople
American chief executives
Fellows of the Acoustical Society of America
20th-century American engineers